Lycée Martin Luther King may refer to:
 Lycée Martin Luther King (Bussy-Saint-Georges)
 Lycée Martin Luther King in Lyon
 Lycée Martin Luther King in Narbonne
 Lycée d'enseignement adapté Martin Luther King in Asnières-sur-Seine

See also
 Martin Luther King (disambiguation)
 Martin Luther King High School (disambiguation) for high schools in the United States named after King
 Martin Luther King Middle School (disambiguation)